Richard Peters (April 7, 1920 – May 26, 1973) was an American football player and coach  He was the 16th head football coach Ottawa University in Ottawa, Kansas, serving for two stints, from 1949 to 1952 and from 1957 to 1971, compiling a record 129–42–3 (.741). His teams with eight Kansas Collegiate Athletic Conference (KCAC) titles.

Between his two tenures at Ottawa, Peters was an assistant coach at Southern Methodist University (SMU) under Woody Woodard, who had coached against Peters at McPherson College. After his second stint at Ottawa, Peters went to Kansas State University and served as an assistant coach under Vince Gibson until his death, in 1973, of an apparent heart attack.  Peters served as President of the NAIA Football Coaches Association from 1964 until 1966 and was inducted into the NAIA Football Hall of Fame in 1973.

Head coaching record

See also 
 List of college football head coaches with non-consecutive tenure

References

1920 births
1973 deaths
Kansas State Wildcats football coaches
Kansas State Wildcats football players
Ottawa Braves football coaches
SMU Mustangs football coaches
People from Valley Falls, Kansas